The Papuan bandicoot (Microperoryctes papuensis) is a species of marsupial in the family Peramelidae. It is endemic to Papua New Guinea. Its natural habitat is subtropical or tropical dry forests. M. papuensis is a small bandicoot with a soft coat with a clear back, upper torso and face stripes.

References

Peramelemorphs
Endemic fauna of Papua New Guinea
Marsupials of New Guinea
Mammals of Papua New Guinea
Least concern biota of Oceania
Mammals described in 1952
Taxonomy articles created by Polbot
Taxa named by Eleanor Mary Ord Laurie